KMGA (99.5 MHz) is a commercial FM radio station licensed to Albuquerque, New Mexico. The station is owned by Cumulus Media and broadcasts an adult contemporary radio format.  For much of November and December it switches to Christmas music.  The radio studios and offices are in Downtown Albuquerque.

KMGA has an effective radiated power (ERP) of 22,500 watts.  The transmitter tower is atop Sandia Crest east of the city.

Programming

Personalities
Notable personalities on the station include nationally syndicated hosts Bob & Sheri (mornings) and John Tesh "Intelligence for Your Life" (evenings) along with local hosts Steph Duran (middays) and Doug Duroucher (afternoons).  On January 1, 2018, KMGA changed slogans to "Today's Best Mix", with no changes in staff or format.

Past morning shows include Meredith Dunkel and Chris Fox of "The Meredith and Fox Show" which began in June 2015. Another change in mornings happened in November 2016 when Meredith was joined by a new co-host, Doug Durocher from San Bernardino, California. In January 2017 Bryan Simmons joined KMGA as program director from Los Angeles. In June 2017 a new host Steph Duran from sister station KRST joined the morning show replacing Meredith Dunkel who left for a new job in Tucson, Arizona. The show was then billed as "The Magic Morning Show with Doug & Duran."

Scott Simon and Rachel Michaels had hosted "Magic in the morning with Simon and Rachel" beginning in late May 2014. Simon and Rachel had moved over from country sister station KRST, which at that time had picked up the Nash FM brand as well as its national morning show. However Simon and Rachel were out after 11 months. Phil Moore had previously hosted mornings for seventeen years before retiring. By May 2012, KMGA became the market's only AC station.

Christmas music
For many years, KMGA plays Christmas music during part of November and most of December. Like most AC radio stations around the country, KMGA changes its format each year to playing all Christmas music beginning sometime in November until December 26. The slogan used during this period is "Albuquerque's Home for the Holidays".

In November 2017, Christmas music began the second week of November starting earlier than in the past. In another unusual move, Christmas music was also featured throughout Labor Day weekend in 2020 branded as "Quarantine Christmas" to "lift the spirits" of listeners in the midst of the COVID-19 pandemic.

History
On November 11, 1963, the station first signed on as KARA-FM, the original call sign.  From the mid 1960s to the early 80s, it also used the call letters KBNM-FM, KMYR and KZZX.

The station was assigned the KMGA call sign by the Federal Communications Commission on September 18, 1985.

Jingles and imaging
Currently KMGA uses the "Pure AC Bright" jingle package. KMGA commissioned the Brighter version, and WWLI in Providence, Rhode Island, also owned by Cumulus, commissioned the Lighter version.

In the past KMGA used various packages from Reelworld until 2014.

KMGA uses the Benztown AC library for imaging, along with other AC stations owned by Cumulus.

References

External links
KMGA official website

FCC History Cards for KMGA

Mainstream adult contemporary radio stations in the United States
Cumulus Media radio stations
MGA
Radio stations established in 1963
1963 establishments in New Mexico